Cley Hall, in Cley next the Sea, Norfolk, is a Grade II listed house in Norfolk.

References

External links 
http://www.mcnamarallp.co.uk/projects/cley-hall/

Grade II listed houses in Norfolk
Cley next the Sea